Mahmoud Abou El-Saoud Zaki Mohamed Kassem (born November 30, 1987) is an Egyptian footballer who plays as a goalkeeper for Egyptian Premier League side El Mokawloon El Arab. He was also a member of Egypt national football team.

Club career

Mansoura
Although he was still playing for the Egyptian Second Division side Mansoura, Mahmoud Abou El-Saoud greatly shined. After a long and intense race with Smouha in 2008–09, Abou El-Saoud led his club to promote from the second division to the Premier League. He continued to put strong performances with his side in the Premier League and as a result he was called by Hassan Shehata to the Egypt national football team for his first time ever. Even with his strong showing, Mansoura was eventually relegated to the second division by the end of the 2009–10 season.

Al Ahly
On 22 June 2010, Mansoura chairman, Ibrahim Megahed, announced the transfer of Mahmoud Abou El-Saoud to the Cairo giant Al Ahly. The transfer was estimated for LE 5 million. He made a few appearances in the league, and despite two goalkeeping mistakes in Al Ahly's match against Ismaily that cost them the game, he started the next game, against Semouha, under new coach Zizo.

International career
Although Mahmoud Abou El-Saoud was part of the Egyptian squad that won the 2010 Africa Cup of Nations, he did not participate in any of the matches.

Honors

National team
 Africa Cup of Nations: 2010.

References

External links
 
 

1987 births
Living people
Egyptian footballers
Egypt international footballers
2010 Africa Cup of Nations players
Association football goalkeepers
People from Mansoura, Egypt
Egyptian Premier League players
El Mansoura SC players
Smouha SC players
Al Ahly SC players
Al Mokawloon Al Arab SC players
El Qanah FC players